Talal Omar Abdillahi (born 12 May 1967) is a Djiboutian long-distance athlete.

Abdillahi has competed at the Olympics twice, firstly at the 1988 Summer Olympics, where he finished 18th in his heat in the 10,000 metres so didn't qualify for the final, four years later he entered the  marathon at the 1992 Summer Olympics but he didn't finish the course.

References

1967 births
Living people
Djiboutian male marathon runners
Athletes (track and field) at the 1988 Summer Olympics
Athletes (track and field) at the 1992 Summer Olympics
Olympic athletes of Djibouti
Djiboutian male long-distance runners